Arturo Rodríguez (born 1956) is a Cuban-born American visual artist. He is a painter, but also works in other mediums including NFTs. He is best known for his psychologically charged, figurative paintings. He lives in Miami, Florida.

Biography 
Arturo Rodríguez was born on February 6, 1956, in Ranchuelo, Villa Clara Province, Cuba. In either 1971 or 1973, when he was a teenager his family moved from Cuba to Asturias and Madrid in Spain; followed by a move in 1973 or 1976 to Miami, where they settled. He attended Miami Dade Community College (now Miami Dade College). In his early career he used the pseudonym Hierommus Fromm to illustrate children's books.

He met his future wife at an art opening at Meeting Point Gallery in Miami in 1978, artist Demi, whom he married in 1984. His artwork is often influenced by his relationship with his wife. He is considered a self-taught painter.

His artwork is in public museum and art collections, including the Whitney Museum of American Art, the Metropolitan Museum of Art, Smithsonian American Art Museum, the Israel Museum, Norton Museum of Art, Cintas Foundation, Bass Museum, Perez Art Museum Miami, Polk Museum of Art, Center for the Arts in Vero Beach, Tampa Museum of Art, Museum of Art Fort Lauderdale, Lowe Art Museum, Gulf Coast Museum of Art, Boca Raton Museum of Art, the Frost Art Museum, Museum of Latin American Art, and the Miami-Dade Public Library System.

See also 
 Aaron Gilbert
 List of Cuban artists

References

External links 
 Demi and Arturo Rodríguez papers, circa 1957-2016, from Archives of American Art, Smithsonian Institution
 Oral history interview with Arturo Rodríguez, 2020 August 26, from Archives of American Art, Smithsonian Institution

1956 births
Living people
People from Ranchuelo
Miami Dade College alumni
Cuban emigrants to the United States
20th-century Cuban painters
21st-century Cuban painters
20th-century American painters
21st-century American painters